Pordoi is a pass in the Dolomites in the Alps, located between the Sella group in the north and the Marmolada group in the south. It is the second highest surfaced road traversing a pass in the Dolomites, after the Sella Pass.

Starting from Arabba, the ascent to the top is 9.4 km (5.84 mi) long.

Maratona dles Dolomites 
Pordoi Pass is the second of seven Dolomite mountain passes that cyclists cross in the annual Maratona dles Dolomites single-day bicycle race.

A memorial to Fausto Coppi stands at the summit of the pass that commemorates the world-renowned Giro d'Italia tour.

Gallery

See also
 List of highest paved roads in Europe
 List of mountain passes

References

External links
Passo Pordoi from Canazei by cyclingdolomites.com
Passo Pordoi from Arabby by cyclingdolomites.com
Profile on climbbybike.com

Mountain passes of the Dolomites
Mountain passes of South Tyrol